, is a Japanese visual novel originally developed and released by D.O. in 1999.  translated and published the English version in 2002.

Kana: Little Sister has received widespread attention from the eroge player community, with many players shed tears during the game due to their feelings about the plot. The plot was also well-received by critics, who felt that it deals with themes such as love, life and family. However, their reactions to the endings and the relationship between Takamichi and Kana were mixed.

Gameplay
Kana: Little Sister is a visual novel, which falls into the subgenre of "nakige". The player assumes the role of Takamichi Toudou. Most of the gameplay is spent reading text, representing the story's dialogue. The text is accompanied by character sprites, which represent who Takamichi is talking to, over background art. Throughout the game, the player encounters CG artwork at certain points in the story, which take the place of the background art and character sprites.

Kana: Little Sister follows a branching plot line with multiple endings, and depending on the decisions that the player makes during the game, the plot will progress in a specific direction. Being an erotic visual novel, relationships between characters become sexual; this include the sexual relationship between Takamichi and his younger sister Kana Toudou. The game has six different endings.

Plot
 suffers a chronic kidney disease that requires her to be hospitalized for long periods of time. Although her older brother  resents the resulting diversion of attention from their parents, he changes his attitude towards Kana during a family trip; Kana and her family are separated, so Takamichi must find her in the forest. He creates wishes that he will protect Kana during the searching process.

Takamichi falls in love with his classmate  while studying in Year 5, so he writes her a love letter and leaves it on her desk. However, other classmates know about his feelings towards Kashima and start teasing him the next day. He believes that Kashima deliberately showed the love letter to everyone, stops communicating with her until he graduates from high school, and concentrates on looking after his younger sister. Kana relies on her brother for emotional support as she rarely goes back to school.

Kana develops romantic feelings for Takamichi when he graduates from high school. Kashima confesses her feelings for Takamichi at the same time. At this time, however, Kana's condition deteriorates, and she is given a few months left to live at most. Takamichi begins a relationship with Kashima while studying at university. However, his feelings for Kana begin to bother him, and he becomes aware of the fact that Kana is not related to him by blood. After this, the plot will unfold differently depending on the player's previous choices, and Kana dies in most endings.

Development and release
Kana: Little Sister is the first visual novel developed by D.O., and was released for Windows on June 25, 1999. Hajime Yamada is the visual novel's scenario writer, who is first time being this position. According to the Japanese magazine BugBug, the team focuses more on the feeling of caring rather than likes and loves. After Kana: Little Sister, Hajime Yamada continued to work for D.O. as a scenario writer, wrote the scenario for the visual novels Hoshizora ☆ Planet and Family Project. These three works were known as "Hajime Yamada Trilogy" by D.O staff.

An email application featuring Kana was released on March 17, 2000. The user is prompted by Kana on-screen when an email is sent to the mailbox. A revival Windows edition of the game was released on the same day under the title Kana...Okaeri‼ (加奈⋯おかえり！！—"Kana…Welcome Home!"). This new version retains the original storyline but features new character designs and full voice acting. A Mac OS version was subsequently published on June 30, 2000. In 2003, Panther Software announced plans to release an Xbox port, which was ultimately cancelled.

As reported by GNN News and Game Watch in July 2010, Cyber Front announced that the game would port to the PlayStation Portable in two different editions, Regular Edition and Limited Edition. Limited Edition of the game would be bundled with music soundtrack and art book. It featuring the character designs and artwork from the original PC version of the game, with re-recorded voices and artwork created specifically for the PSP version. Cyber Front released two demo videos in the same month and next month. Both editions were released on October 7 of the same year. An English translation of Kana Okaeri was released in 2015 by JAST USA.

Reception
Kana: Little Sister has received widespread attention from the eroge player community, with many players shed tears during the game due to their feelings about the plot, and some players have registered as bone marrow donors after playing the game. However, Kazuya Haneda's comment on Bishōjo Games Maniacs indicated that the game has received mixed reviews from players. When the game was released, it quickly became a hot topic on the Internet. with most online reviews focus on the plot and artwork, although some online reviews have accused the game of sexualising minors because of Kana's appearance. Writing for Introduction to Cultural Studies Adult Games, Naoki Miyamoto said that Kana: Little Sister along with the games developed by Key were considered as masterpieces of "nakige" in the late 1990s.

The plot of Kana: Little Sister was well-received by critics, who felt that it deals with themes such as love, life and family. Au Yeung Yu Leung of IGN Japan praised the game for making her realize the value of life.  extended this feeling to the general players. Au Yeung also voted it as the best video game of 1999, and compared the game to Air. She felt strongly about the relationship between Takamichi and Kana among with other contents. The game is known for its "depressing" and "touching" storyline. Pasokon bishōjo gēmu rekishi taizen: 1982-2000 specifically commented that the development of Takamichi and Kana's romantic relationship under their "tragic encounter" was "touching". In addition to the character's encounters, The Escapist Leigh Alexander also find "simple empathy" for "well-drawn individuals". Haneda, on the other hand, criticized its setting as "too common", but also praised for its unexpected mid-to-late development.

Another aspect of Kana: Little Sister that was commended includes the player's empathy. According to Pasokon bishōjo gēmu rekishi taizen: 1982-2000, the player would experience the same psychological pain as Takamichi. Au Yeung felt that Kana was her real-life younger sister while playing, and attributed this to the plot's focus on Kana. In , Hiroyuki Maeda analyzed that the player's empathy came from the text, especially the psychological description of the characters.

Critical responses to the endings and the relationship between Takamichi and Kana were mixed. Alexander called the game "handled delicately" on Takamichi and Kana's relationship, which distinguishes it from other eroge. Au Yeung criticized the team for setting Kana as an unrelated younger sister due to public's perception. Regarding the endings, Haneda voted the ending 2 "Recollection" as the most touching, and felt that the ending of Kana survives was only meaningful after completing the other endings. Au Yeung, however, criticized the latter as contradicted other endings.

References

External links
G-Collections.com - developers of the English-language translation

1999 video games
Bishōjo games
Eroge
Classic Mac OS games
PlayStation Portable games
Incest in fiction
Video games developed in Japan
Visual novels
Windows games